The Copa del Presidente de la República 1936 (President of the Republic's Cup) was the 36th staging of the Copa del Rey, the Spanish football cup competition.

The competition started in February, 1936 and concluded on June 21, 1936, with the final, held at the Mestalla stadium in Valencia. Real Madrid, known as Madrid FC under the Second Spanish Republic, won the match 2-1 for their seventh cup victory, defeating FC Barcelona in the first El Clásico final. Defending champions Sevilla FC lost to Hércules CF in a Round-of-16 replay.

It was the final season before the tournament was cancelled due to the Spanish Civil War, returning in 1939 as the Copa del Generalísimo.

Teams
ASTURIAS-GALICIA: Oviedo FC, Sporting de Gijón, Stadium Club Avilesino, Club Celta, Club Deportivo de La Coruña, Unión Sportiva Vigo, Club Lemos.
BALEARES: CD Mallorca.
CANARIAS: UD Tenerife.
CASTILLA-ARAGÓN: Madrid FC, Athletic Club de Madrid, CD Nacional de Madrid, Valladolid Deportivo, Zaragoza FC, Racing Club de Santander, UD Salamanca.
CATALUÑA: FC Barcelona, Gerona FC, CD Español, CD Sabadell FC, CD Júpiter, FC Badalona, Granollers CD.
LEVANTE: Hércules FC, Murcia FC, Valencia FC, Levante FC, Gimnástico FC, Elche FC, Cartagena FC.
NORTE DE ÁFRICA: Athletic Club de Tetuán.
PAÍS VASCO: Arenas Club, Athletic Club de Bilbao, Baracaldo FC, Erandio FC, Donostia FC, Unión Club, CA Osasuna.
REGIÓN SUR: Sevilla FC, Betis Balompié, Xerez SC, CD Malacitano, Club Recreativo de Granada, Mirandilla FC, RCD Córdoba.

First round

Group 1

 Stadium Club Avilesino was withdrew before of the start the tournament.

Group 2

Group 3

Group 4

Group 5

Elche FC was disqualified

Group 6

Group 7

Second round

|}

Tiebreaker

|}

Third round

|}

Fourth round

|}

Tiebreaker

|}

Round of 16

|}
Tiebreaker

|}

Quarter-finals

|}

Semi-finals

|}

Final

|}

References

External links
 rsssf.com
 linguasport.com

1936
1936 domestic association football cups
1935–36 in Spanish football